Saint-Martin-Valmeroux (；) is a commune in the Cantal department in south-central France.

Geography
The Maronne river flows through the middle of the commune and crosses the village of Saint-Martin-Valmeroux.

Population

See also
Communes of the Cantal department

References

Communes of Cantal
Cantal communes articles needing translation from French Wikipedia